Bankers Hall is a building complex located in downtown Calgary, Alberta, which includes twin 52-storey office towers (197 metres high), designed by the architectural firm Cohos Evamy in postmodern architectural style.

The first building, known as Bankers Hall East, is located at 855 2nd Street SW and was completed in 1989. It was followed in 2000 by Bankers Hall West, at 888 3rd Street SW. After its completion, they became the tallest twin buildings in Canada.

Both buildings contain four-level podiums with an upscale retail gallery connected to the Plus 15 skywalk network. The Core Shopping Centre, the largest shopping complex in downtown Calgary, is directly connected via Plus 15. The northeast corner of the complex incorporates the historic Hollinsworth Building, whose intricate terra cotta facade has been fully restored. 

The distinctive crowns of the buildings are intended to resemble cowboy hats when viewed from afar; Bankers Hall West is topped by a gold roof structure while the East building's crown is in silver. A white cowboy hat has long been an iconic symbol of Calgary, being portrayed on the city's flag, and presented as gifts to foreign dignitaries by the civic government at "white hatting ceremonies".

For tenants and people who work in and around Bankers Hall, there is also a fitness centre called Bankers Hall Club.  Bankers Hall Club occupies the old space of the Bankers Hall Five movie theater which was open from 1990 to 2001.

Major Tenant
Canadian Natural Resources Limited

Gallery

See also
List of tallest buildings in Calgary
List of shopping malls in Canada

References

External links
Bankers Hall

Bank buildings in Canada
Twin towers
Brookfield Properties buildings
Postmodern architecture in Canada
Dialog (architectural firm) buildings